Mario Bellizzi (born 1957), a poet of the Arbëresh minority of southern Italy, was born in San Basile in the province of Cosenza. His verse has appeared in various Arbëresh periodicals in southern Italy, as well as in Kosovo and Albania. Bellizzi currently lives in Trebisacce on the Gulf of Taranto. Among his verse collections are: Who are We Now?, Peć 1997; and Last Exit to Bukura Morea, Castrovillari 2003.

Sources 
Albanian Literature from Robert Elsie

1957 births
Living people
Italian poets
Italian male poets
Italian people of Arbëreshë descent
Albanian-language poets